NFL Fever 2004 is an American football video game published and developed by Microsoft Game Studios. It was released in 2003 for the Xbox video game console. The game was preceded by NFL Fever 2003 and is the last entry in the series.

Reception

NFL Fever 2004 received "average" reviews according to the review aggregation website Metacritic. In Japan, where the game was ported for release on October 23, 2003, Famitsu gave it a score of 27 out of 40.

References

External links
 

2003 video games
Microsoft games
NFL Fever video games
Video games developed in the United States
Xbox games
Xbox-only games